The president of the Republic of Lithuania is the head of state of Lithuania. The officeholder has been Gitanas Nausėda since 12 July 2019.

Powers
The president has somewhat more executive authority than his counterparts in Estonia and Latvia; his function is very similar to that of the presidents of France and Romania. Similarly to them, but unlike presidents in a fully presidential system such as the United States, he generally has the most authority in foreign affairs. In addition to the customary diplomatic powers of Heads of State, namely receiving the letters of credence of foreign ambassadors and signing treaties, the president determines Lithuania's basic foreign policy guidelines. He is also the commander-in-chief of the Lithuanian Armed Forces, and accordingly heads the State Defense Council and has the right to appoint the Chief of Defence (subject to Seimas consent).

The president also has a significant role in domestic policy. He has the right to submit bills to the Seimas and to veto laws passed by it, appoints the prime minister and approves the government formed by him, and has the right to dissolve the Seimas and call snap elections following a successful motion of no confidence or if the Seimas refuses to approve the government's budget within sixty days. However, the next elected Seimas may retaliate by calling for an earlier presidential election.

Finally, the president ensures an effective judiciary; he nominates one-third of the judges of the Constitutional Court, and the entirety of the Supreme Court, for appointment by the Seimas, and has the right to directly appoint all other judges.

Election
Under the Constitution of Lithuania adopted in 1992, the president is elected to a five-year term under a modified two-round system: a candidate requires an absolute majority of the vote and either voter turnout to be above 50% or for their vote share to be equivalent to at least one-third of the number of registered voters to win the election in the first round. If no candidate does so, the two candidates with the most votes face each other in a second round held two weeks later. Upon taking office, the president must suspend any formal membership in a political party.

If the president dies or becomes incapacitated while in office, the Speaker of the Seimas assumes the office until a new president can be inaugurated following fresh elections.

List of presidents

See also
List of rulers of Lithuania

References